Events from the year 1977 in Taiwan. This year is numbered Minguo 66 according to the official Republic of China calendar.

Incumbents 
 President – Yen Chia-kan
 Vice President – Chiang Ching-kuo
 Premier – Chiang Ching-kuo
 Vice Premier – Hsu Ching-chung

Events

July 
 9 July – President Yen Chia-kan visited Saudi Arabia.

August 
 1 August – The opening of Magong Airport in Penghu County.

Births 
 24 January - Cheng Yung-jen, football player
 1 April – Ehlo Huang, actor and singer
 9 April – Kawlo Iyun Pacidal, member of 9th Legislative Yuan
 20 April – Chan Yih-shin, golf athlete
 28 April – Lawrence Ko, actor
 29 April – Tsai Hsien-tang, football player
 2 May – Blackie Chen, television host and basketball player
 8 June – Dylan Kuo, actor, singer and model
 1 July – Kao Cheng-hua, baseball player
 31 August – Shen Po-tsang, baseball player
 14 September – Yen Kuan-heng, member of Legislative Yuan
 2 October – Samingad, singer
 12 December – Cheryl Yang, actress
 20 December – Patty Hou, former news anchor

Deaths 
 22 June – Hu Lien, general

References 

 
Years of the 20th century in Taiwan